Irstead is a village and former civil parish, now in the parish of Barton Turf, in the North Norfolk district, in the county of Norfolk, England. The village is situated at Irstead Shoals, on the River Ant just south of Barton Broad, the second largest of the Norfolk Broads. In 1931 the parish had a population of 113.

History 
The villages name means 'Mud place'. On 1 April 1935 the parish was abolished and merged with Barton Turf.

References

External links

.
Information from Genuki Norfolk on Irstead.

 

Villages in Norfolk
Former civil parishes in Norfolk
North Norfolk